Österbybruk is a locality situated in Östhammar Municipality, Uppsala County, Sweden with 2,272 inhabitants in 2010.

Ironworks
The Österby works was one of a number mostly in Roslagen, where there were Walloon forges, producing high quality oregrounds iron for export.  Österby's brand mark was OO. All iron was branded with that mark. The Österby ironproducts were highly valued in England for the production of blister steel by the cementation process.

The historical complex of Österbybruk is a "Vallonbruk", a social and economic building complex surrounding a forge. Österbybruk is one of the most beautiful examples of the remains of the presence and input of Walloon immigrants ('valloner') in Sweden in the 17th century. More than 1.200 families emigrated in that era to Sweden, where the expertise of Walloon master blacksmiths was highly sought after. They helped to launch the Swedish iron and metal industry. The number of their descendants is estimated today between 500.000 and 1 million people.

People

Karl Kilbom, the leader of the Swedish Communist Party 1924-1929 was born here, and one of the main streets of Österbybruk is named after him today.

Climate
Österbybruk has a humid continental climate that is quite mild throughout the year, especially considering its northerly latitude.

References 

Populated places in Uppsala County
Populated places in Östhammar Municipality
Ironworks in Sweden